Aleksandr Grigoryevich Shulga (born 30 September 1975) is a former Russian football player.

In the only Russian Football Premier League game he ever played on 25 October 1996 he came on as a half-time substitute for Mikhail Volodin. Then he was sent off in 70th minute, so midfielder Maksim Demenko had to play goalkeeper for the rest of the game.

References

External links
 

1975 births
Living people
Russian footballers
FC Lada-Tolyatti players
Russian Premier League players
Association football goalkeepers